Parapercis millepunctata, the black dotted sand perch, is a fish species in the sandperch family, Pinguipedidae. It is found throughout the Indian and South Pacific Oceans.

References

Randall, J.E., G.R. Allen and R.C. Steene, 1990. Fishes of the Great Barrier Reef and Coral Sea. University of Hawaii Press, Honolulu, Hawaii. 506 p.

Pinguipedidae
Taxa named by Albert Günther
Fish described in 1860